Carbalia is a commune and village in the Gagauz Autonomous Territorial Unit of the Republic of Moldova. The village is part of the Vulcanesti district. Being both an enclave and an exclave it is surrounded by the Cahul District and the Taraclia District.

The 2004 census listed the commune as having a population of 534 people. Gagauz total 375. Minorities included 78 Moldovans, 18 Russians, 23 Ukrainians, and 32 Bulgarians.

Carbalia's geographical coordinates are 45° 52' 24" North, 28° 26' 45" East.

See also
 Vulcănești

References

Carbalia